Brigite da Conceição Francisco dos Santos (born 5 October 1989, in Luanda) is an Angolan model and beauty pageant titleholder who represented Angola during the Miss World 2008-event in South Africa.  She placed among the top five finalists, and was awarded the Miss World Africa Continental Queen of Beauty title.

References

1989 births
Living people
Angolan beauty pageant winners
Miss World 2008 delegates
People from Luanda